This is a list of Belgian television related events from 1992.

Events
8 March - Morgane is selected to represent Belgium at the 1992 Eurovision Song Contest with her song "Nous, on veut des violons". She is selected to be the thirty-seventh Belgian Eurovision entry during Eurosong held at the RTBF Studios in Brussels.
Unknown - Jan van den Bossche, performing as Gerard Joling, wins the fourth season of VTM Soundmixshow.

Debuts

Television shows

1980s
VTM Soundmixshow (1989-1995, 1997-2000)

1990s
Samson en Gert (1990–2019)
Familie (1991–present)

Ending this year

Births

Deaths

References